Fish Lake is a natural lake in South Dakota, in the United States.

Fish Lake received its name from the large stock of fish in its waters.

See also
List of lakes in South Dakota

References

Lakes of South Dakota
Lakes of Aurora County, South Dakota